The DRDO Glide Bomb is a product of the Defence Research and Development Organisation to deploy a standardised medium range precision guided weapon, especially for engagement of targets from outside the range of standard anti-aircraft defenses, thereby increasing aircraft survivability and minimising friendly losses.

Development 
The bomb was designed by the nodal Laboratory Research Centre Imarat in Hyderabad with the help of Defence Avionics Research Establishment (DARE) in Bengaluru, Terminal Ballistics Research Laboratory (TBRL) in Chandigarh and Armaments Research and Development Establishment (ARDE) in Pune. The team designed the bomb specially for the Indian Air Force to fill their requirement of precision guided weapons.

Variants 
Under the DRDO's Long Range Glide Bomb (LRGB) project, 2 variants have been planned:
Gaurav - The winged version. It has a range of up to 100 km and weights 1,000-kg. It can carry either pre-fragmented or penetration-blast type of warhead.

 Gautham - The non-winged version. It has a range of 30 km and in future the range will be enhanced to 100 km weights 550-kg. It can also carry either pre-fragmented or penetration-blast type of warhead.Although this bomb lacks wings, it does include a control surface that works in conjunction with the inbuilt navigation and guidance system.

The length of both the bombs is 4 meters. The diameter of both the bombs is 0.62 m.
Both bombs have onboard inertial navigation system with GPS and NaVIC Satellite Guidance System.

Trials 
The DRDO and the Indian Air Force (IAF) successfully tested a 1,000 kg glide bomb on 19 December 2014 that covered a range of 100 km guided through its on-board navigation system. The flight path is of the glide bomb was monitored by DRDO radars and electro-optic systems situated at Integrated Test Range (ITR), Chandipur. On 17 August 2018, the IAF and DRDO did a covert successful trial of Gautham and Gaurav at Pokhran firing range, Jaisalmer.

Long Range Glide Bomb - Gaurav 

DRDO and IAF successfully tested Long Range Bomb (LRB) on 29 October 2021 from Su-30MKI at Balasore, Odisha. The bomb was released from 10 km altitude which successfully hit a sea based target using laser guidance. It is a 1,000 kg bomb which DRDO developed as an alternative to Spice 2000. The LRGB is a part of a family of newly developed precision guided munitions with a range of 50 km to 150 km in range.

Operators

Indian Air Force

See also
BLU-109 bomb - United States

References

Defence Research and Development Organisation
Guided bombs